The 2015 Adamawa State gubernatorial election occurred in Nigeria on April 11, 2015. APC candidate Bindo Jibrilla won the election, defeating Markus Gundiri of the SDP.

Bindo Jibrilla emerged APC gubernatorial candidate after scoring 2,718 votes and defeating his closest rival, Ibrahim Mijinyawa Yayaji who received 2,268 votes. He picked Martins Babale as his running mate. Markus Gundiri was the SDP candidate. 8 candidates contested in the election.

Electoral system
The Governor of Adamawa State is elected using the plurality voting system.

APC primary
The APC primary election was held on December 4, 2014. Ahmadu Umaru Fintiri won the primary election polling 1,656 votes against 5 other candidates. His closest rival was Ibrahim Mijinyawa Yayaji, who came second with 2,268 votes, Mustapha scored 515 votes, Ahmed Barata scored 452 votes, while Yakubu Tsalla and Emmanuel Bello got 147 and 50 votes respectively.

Results
A total number of 8 candidates registered with the Independent National Electoral Commission to contest in the election.

Total number of votes cast was 706,092, while number of valid votes was 684,050. Rejected votes were 27,790.

References 

Adamawa State gubernatorial election
Adamawa State gubernatorial elections